David Garlan from the Carnegie Mellon University was named Fellow of the Institute of Electrical and Electronics Engineers (IEEE) in 2013 for contributions to software architecture.

References

Fellow Members of the IEEE
Living people
Carnegie Mellon University faculty
21st-century American engineers
Year of birth missing (living people)
Place of birth missing (living people)
American electrical engineers